The 2000 Asian Men's Handball Championship was the ninth Asian Championship, which was taking place from 25 30 January 30 2000 in Kumamoto, Japan. It acted as the Asian qualifying tournament for the 2000 Olympic Games.

Standings

Results
All times are local (UTC+9).

Final standing

References
Results

External links
www.handball.jp

H
Asian Handball Championships
H
Asian
January 2000 sports events in Asia